Mary Perry was a volleyball player.

Mary Perry may also refer to:
Mary Jane Perry, American oceanographer
Mary Antoinette Perry, American actress and director
Mary Christine Hudson (née Perry), mother of Katy Perry

See also
Melvin W. and Mary Perry House
Mary Chase Perry Stratton, American ceramic artist
Mary Perry Smith, American mathematics educator